The prime minister of the Yemen Arab Republic was the head of government of that country in what is now northern Yemen. The Prime Minister was appointed by the President. There were twelve prime ministers of North Yemen.

List of prime ministers of the Yemen Arab Republic (1962–1990)

For prime ministers of Yemen after 1990, see Prime Minister of Yemen.

Footnotes

See also
Imams of Yemen
President of Yemen Arab Republic
List of heads of government of Yemen
List of leaders of South Yemen

External links
World Statesmen - North Yemen

History of Yemen
 
Government of Yemen
Yemen Arab Republic, Prime Minister of
Yemen history-related lists
Yemen politics-related lists